In British law, an ancient monument is an early historical structure or monument (e.g. an archaeological site) worthy of preservation and study due to archaeological or heritage interest. The Ancient Monuments and Archaeological Areas Act 1979 classified ancient monuments as "scheduled monuments" or monuments that are considered by the Secretary of State of archaeological, historical or artistic importance.

In addition, the term "ancient monument" can also refer to any early or historical manmade structure and/or architecture. Certain ancient monuments are of cultural importance for nations and become symbols of international recognition, including the ruins of Baalbek on Lebanese currency, the Angkor Wat on Cambodian currency and the Great Wall of China on the Chinese currency. There are some countries that display ancient buildings as symbols on their coats of arms as a way to affirm national identity. In this way, ancient monuments in the modern world are used as icons to represent a country. The importance of ancient monuments extends to cultural heritage and how the people of a nation or city identify themselves.

Historical significance and cultural heritage 

National identity and iconography

Since the eighteenth and nineteenth centuries, with the rise of nationalism, part of the nation-building process was the construction of a national past.  This past comprised a collection of legends, traditions and myths. In Europe's emerging nations, ruins and relics became the centre of attention for group consciousness and national aspirations, which became an important motivation for the emergence of a preservation movement. This was because many buildings, landscapes and monuments achieved a great level of significance as symbols and icons of a growing nation. As such, these buildings and landscapes became national monuments, which possessed new meanings given the emergence of nationhood. Light and Dumbraveanu-Andone assert that the connection between heritage and national identity continues to be important. This is also evident in national identity related to an awareness of national heritage that is still visible around the world.
Archaeology

The emergence of the discipline of archaeology was linked to the rise of nationalism. It was often emphasised to be used in service of the nation-state to reinforce its historical and territorial legitimacy. Archaeology as a culture-historical discipline is the study and preservation of remains from past societies and their environments.  In this, the past is studied through preserving its sources including landscape (ancient monuments and/or heritage sites) and physical artefacts. The preservation and restoration are important for all heritage sites, particularly at locations of ancient monuments and archaeological areas that are in dangerous or delicate conditions.

Preservation and care 
To protect, preserve and care for ancient monuments, there were a number of laws and Acts passed during the late nineteenth and twentieth century.  These included Ancient Monuments Protection Act of 1882 and Ancient Monuments and Archaeological Areas Act 1979. The aforementioned was passed after several unsuccessful attempts, which ensured governmental involvement in England and Ireland to legally preserve and conserve ancient monuments. Following this, in 1913, the Ancient Monuments Consolidation and Amendment Act provided an extension to the existing powers by introducing a concept known as the Preservation Orders. This enabled monuments in threat of damage and/or removal from neglectful treatment to be classified under the protection of the Commissioners of Works. The most significant was Section 6.2, which qualified the monuments as national importance and were to be preserved. Additionally, any ancient monument could be considered for inclusion on that list, not just those in the Guardian of the State, and this meant that for the first time legislative protection could officially be applied on a large scale. It was as a result of this that Guardianship Monuments were distinguished to what later became defined as "Scheduled Monuments".

Furthermore, the Ancient Monuments Act 1931 extended its protection policies around previous monuments, including the scheduled monuments on the list, through introducing a notification system. As part of this system, monument owners had to provide the Commissioners of Works three months' notice in writing of any works affecting the monument, which remained in use until 1979. During the 1930s and 1940s, there were a number of background strategies by various organisations concerned with ancient monuments. In the immediate aftermath of the Second World War, a committee was established to look into the existing state and future direction of archaeological work in Britain. This resulted in the publication of A Survey and policy of field research in the archaeology of Great Britain and from this, more information about the past to fill gaps in knowledge.

 Historic Building and Ancient Monuments Act 1953
 Field Monuments Act 1972
 Ancient Monuments and Archaeological Areas Act 1979: This Act consolidated and strengthen previous legislation made in relation to all types of ancient monuments. In addition to this, a Scheduled Monument Consent system was implemented instead of the notification procedure as outlined previously.

Modern preservation

The modern preservation techniques consist of physical planning and zoning. Physical planning at archaeological sites around ancient monuments help direct the vehicle and pedestrian traffic from sensitive areas.  Additionally, zoning is a key principle of physical planning at monumental sites.   It refers to the physical development and protection of sites in various zones of contact or distance from important resources.  Zoning also enables certain amenities and visitor services to be managed in an effective manner.  There are several approaches to physical planning and zoning at historic monuments. As each site has its own unique environmental concerns and needs, zoning may vary from one to two zones or at times, several zones to protect and manage the area. 

Issues that ancient monuments such as historical buildings face can be linked to internal and external environmental factors. This include the new changes that can add improvements to the interior of the building can also lead to new factors that cause decay. The example Feilden used was of traditional and historical building construction “breathes” are useful as it enables the “easy passage of moisture vapor”.  In these cases, vapour checks and monitoring the environmental factors for balance is required. Other modern methods include preventive maintenance through acts such as the reduction of traffic vibration and/or air pollution through town planning controls.   As a maintenance strategy, this conservative activity is considered as an important protective method without intervention.

Tourism

Heritage tourism

Following the mass decolonisation period post World War II, identity through remains, the past and landscapes became more common and global tourism exponentially increased. With the rise of globalisation, tourism has grown to become a type of commodity during the twenty-first century with new places and elements to discover. In addition to this, the exoticism and romanticism around experiencing other “more authentic” cultures have contributed to heritage and cultural tourism. As a result, ancient monuments are linked to heritage tourism because of the cultural and national aspect that the monuments embody. Heritage tours comprise a number of types including religious tourism and patriotic tourism. In the case of ancient monuments, both types of heritage tourism apply.  

 Religious tourism: The concept of religious heritage tourism has been around for several centuries. According to Bond, Packer and Ballantyne, people have their own purpose and motives for visiting a religious heritage site or location. This included five key factors; to find spiritual and emotional connection, to discover new things, to engage mentally, to interact and/or belong as well as searching for peace to relax. Religious site tourism is also linked to pilgrimage as well as paying a visit to sites such as the Uluru in Australia, the Western Wall, the Church of the Holy Sepulchre and the Dome of the Rock in the Old City of Jerusalem. All these sites are considered to be ancient monuments as they are of historical and cultural importance.

 Patriotic tourism: Tourism that are attached to nationalistic or patriotic sentiments is another type of heritage tourism. In the modern context, post World War I and World War II, certain places and sites and being claimed as nationalistic sites that patriotic tourists visit for the purpose of reclaiming and reaffirming their heritage and national identity. Such sites include the forts and castles of Ghana, the ANZAC Cove and the Great Wall of China. These types of ancient monuments fall under the category of national and historical importance. They are associated with culturally driven tourism linking to the colonial and violent past of nations that have become symbols of cultural reaffirmation and awakening.

Archaeological tourism

Whilst certain types of tourism can negatively impact the sustainability of historical and ancient sites, archaeological tourists have led to the conservation and maintenance of ancient monuments. All archaeological disciplines apply the same types of methods and one includes the study of the physical artefact and/or site. In the modern world, most archaeologists are involved in excavations to rescue and preserve archaeological traces that can be damaged from activities such as housing, road-building, natural gas pipelines or airports.  Cultural heritage plays an important role with globalization and increasing ethnic recognition and thus, this type of management is significant. As such, archaeologists are taking care of several ancient monuments and historical sites, and with the growth of tourism, this has become more vital and is defined as “heritage management”. 

Archaeologists alongside to architects help preserve what other specialists, including art historians, cultural geographers, or ethnologists, study.  These may include medieval churches, monolithic monuments or ancient relics, stupas and/or paintings. For example, the study of the concept of “dying culture” refers to a part or portion of a living, an existing culture that has older origins, however, is still in use. In this case, preservation of traditional objects, artefacts and monuments through archaeological study is both important for ancient monuments and the tourism industry.

Examples of archaeological excavation that are classified as ancient monuments:
 Moai Statues Easter Island, Chile
 Chichen Itza, Mexico
 Tikal, Guatemala
 Acropolis of Athens, Greece
 Giza Pyramids, Egypt
 Ancient Petra, Jordan

Other categories of tourists

 Journalists
 Students studying certain sites
 Volunteers
 Community leaders and politicians

Types of ancient monuments

 Megalithic monuments: Large and rough stones that are arranged in place and preserved for several centuries. These ancient monuments are some of the oldest prehistoric monuments found in a range of countries around the world. Notable examples include Stonehenge on Salisbury Plain, England; Avebury circle near Stonehenge; Chun Quoit; and Uluru in Australia.
 Palaces and castles: These types of monuments are of historical and national importance as some are symbols of their countries.
 Pyramids: A significant example is the Giza Pyramids of ancient Egypt, which were constructed to revere the Pharaoh.
 Sculptural monuments and mosaics: Some ancient monuments such as temples include stone relief sculptures and mosaics. From these ancient monuments, such as the temple of Parthenon, included sculptures that are found in museums like the Louvre and the British Museum. 
 Temples: There are many temples around the world that are classified as ancient monuments and world heritage sites. Somes examples include the Temple of Anahita, Kangavar in Iran, several Ancient Greek temples and Megalithic Temples of Malta.
 Mosques: Early Islamic architecture included elaborate patterns. Some notable examples include the Great Mosque of Damascus (Umayyad Mosque), Masjid Al-Aqsa (Dome of the Rock) and the Tunisian Great Mosque of Kairouan.
 Tombs: Some examples include Mughal emperors tombs such as the tomb of Aurangzeb and Akbar's tomb as well as the Pharaoh Tutankhamun's tomb.

See also 
 English Heritage
 Historic preservation
 Scheduled monument
 Monument

References

External links
  National Heritage List for England: official list of scheduled ancient monuments in England

Types of monuments and memorials
Architectural history
Cultural heritage
National identity
Cultural tourism